Éller is a locality located in the municipality of Bellver de Cerdanya, in Province of Lleida province, Catalonia, Spain. As of 2020, it has a population of 19.

Geography 
Éller is located 213km northeast of Lleida.

References

Populated places in the Province of Lleida